is a town located in Kimotsuki District, Kagoshima Prefecture, Japan.  The town occupies the southern part of the Ōsumi Peninsula and its name literally means "the southern part of Ōsumi."

The town was formed on March 31, 2005 from the merger of the towns of Nejime and Sata, both from Kimotsuki District.

As of April 2017, the town has an estimated population of 9,897.  The total area is 213.59 km².

Geography
Located at 31 degrees north latitude, Minamiōsumi is the southernmost town on the Japanese "mainland" (Japan's four main islands).

Neighboring towns
Kimotsuki
Kinkō.

History
The town name was chosen from among ideas submitted by the public.

Town formation
The village of Nejime became the town of Nejime on January 1, 1941.
The village of Sata became the town of Sata on September 1, 1947.
Nejime and Sata, both from Kimotsuki District, were merged to become Minamiōsumi on March 31, 2005.

Government

Town hall
The former Nejime Town Hall now serves as the Minamiōsumi Town Hall. The former Sata Town Hall is now a branch office.

Local information

Education

High schools
Minamiōsumi High School.

Junior High schools
Nejime Junior High School
Daiichi Sata Junior High School

Elementary schools
Kamiyama Elementary School
Sata Elementary School

Transportation

Bus
Minamiōsumi is served by the Osumi Kotsu Network of buses, operated by the Kagoshima Kotsu Group.

National roads
National Route 269
"Michi no Eki" rest area located at Nejime

Toll roads
Sata Misaki Road Parkway, providing access to Cape Sata

Other information

Famous places
Cape Sata, southernmost point of Japan's four main islands
Ōgawa Waterfall
Nejime Onsen
Former Sata Medicinal Garden
Wild growing Cycas revoluta, the so-called "Sago Palm"

Events
Misaki Festival (February)
Dragon Boat Festival (October)

Famous natives
Mire Aika (1964- ), actress
Naoki Uchizono (1974- ), professional baseball player

References

External links

Minamiōsumi official website 

Towns in Kagoshima Prefecture